Abortion in Malta is illegal in all cases; Malta has one of the most restrictive laws in Europe against abortion laws, alongside Andorra, due to the influence of Roman Catholic Christianity in its law, culture and society; in the 2021 census, around 82% of the population identified as Roman Catholic. Abortion laws are also highly restricted in Poland and in other small European states and territories such as Liechtenstein, and the Faroe Islands.

Malta has a high quality health service with free treatment available at the point of need. Treatment to end an ectopic pregnancy is allowed through a medical protocol which allows for each case to be considered individually in line with the double effect principle i.e. not causing intentional harm to the pregnant woman or her unborn child.

Law on abortion
The Criminal Code, in article 241, states:

In addition, the law prohibits:

 Causing death or grievous bodily harm by means used for miscarriage (article 242);

 Knowingly prescribing or administering the means whereby the miscarriage is procured (article 243); and

 Culpable miscarriage i.e. by imprudence, carelessness, unskilfulness, or non-observance of regulations (article 243A).

The Criminal Code also prohibits, in article 218(1)(c), grevious bodily harm committed on a woman with child which causes a miscarriage; the aggravated offence is punishable with imprisonment for a term from five to ten years.

Proposals
In 2005, Deputy Prime Minister Tonio Borg (a member of the Nationalist Party) sought to amend the Constitution of Malta to include a prohibition on abortion. As it stands, the Constitution states, in article 33(1): "No person shall intentionally be deprived of his life save in execution of the sentence of a court in respect of a criminal offence under the law of Malta of which he has been convicted."  Capital punishment in Malta was abolished by law in 2000.

In May 2021, independent MP Marlene Farrugia made the first legislative proposal to decriminalize abortion by replacing the current law with a law punishing forced abortion with ten years' imprisonment. The Bill did not proceed into law and Ms Farrugia was not elected at the subsequent general election.

In November 2022, Health Minister Chris Fearne, a member of the Labour Party, presented the Criminal Code (Amendment No. 3) Bill which stated:

"No offence under article 241(2) or article 243 shall be committed when the termination of a pregnancy results from a medical intervention aimed at protecting the health of a pregnant woman suffering from a medical complication which may put her life at risk or her health in grave jeopardy."

A group of 80 physicians, lawyers, ethicists and academics in the Inti Tista' Ssalvani coalition have proposed a more limited expert clause, which would change the wording of the proposed law to the following:

"No crime is committed under article 241(2) or article 243 when the death or bodily harm of an unborn child results from a medical intervention conducted with the aim of saving the life of the mother where there is a real and substantial risk of loss of the mother's life from a physical illness."

Around 20,000 people, around 4% of the island's total population, protested outside Parliament against the Bill in December 2022 and were addressed by former President Marie Louise Coleiro Preca.

Leader of the Opposition Bernard Grech stated that the government Bill was a means for the Labour Party to introduce abortion in Malta, and insisted that his Nationalist Party would remain opposed to it.

Statistics
In 2018, Carmel Cacopardo, then leader of the Democratic Alternative party, estimated that between 300 and 400 Maltese women travelled abroad to have abortions each year, mostly to Great Britain (about 60 per year) and Italy, but also to Germany, the Netherlands, and Belgium. 

He added that his party had never advocated for the introduction of an abortion law but believed that more should be done to address circumstances that lead to abortion with genuine respect towards human life not only shown during pregnancy but also before and afterwards. This estimate indicated that the rate of abortion for women from Malta was between 3.6 and 4.7 per thousand women, compared to the EU average of 4.4.

There were 4,464 live births per year in Malta in 2021 – continuing a trend of around 4,400 births per year since 2015 – and 13 stillbirths.  Maternal mortality is rare with only two deaths having been reported since 2002 when the National Obstetric Information System was established.

References

Law of Malta
Health in Malta
Malta
Malta
Women's rights in Malta